Heydarabad (also Romanized as Ḩeydarābād and Haidarābād) is a village in Neh Rural District, in the Central District of Nehbandan County, South Khorasan Province, Iran. At the 2006 census, its population was 418, in 87 families.

References 

Populated places in Nehbandan County